= Executive director =

Managing director of an organization

Executive director is commonly the title of the chief executive officer (CEO) of a company, a nonprofit organization, government agency or international organization.

It generally has the same meaning as CEO or managing director.

The title may also be used by a member of a board of directors for a corporation, such as a company, cooperative or nongovernmental organization, who usually holds a specific managerial position with the corporation. In this context the role is usually contrasted with a non-executive director who usually holds no executive, managerial role with the corporation, but purely an advisory role.

There is much national and cultural variation in the exact definition of an executive director.

== United Nations ==
The title is used for the chief executive officer of several UN agencies, such as UN Women.

== United States ==
The title is widely used in North American not-for-profit organizations, though many United States nonprofits have adopted the title president or CEO.

Confusion can arise because the words executive and director occur both in this title and in titles of various members of some organizations' boards of directors.

In the US nonprofit sector, the executive director role is the highest ranking position within the organization. It corresponds to a CEO position in a for-profit corporation.

=== Role ===
The role of the executive director is to design, develop and implement strategic plans for the organization in a manner that is both cost and time-efficient. The executive director is also responsible for the day-to-day operation of the organization, which includes managing committees and staff as well as developing business plans in collaboration with the board. In essence, the board grants the executive director the authority to run the organization. The executive director is accountable to the board of directors and reports to the board on a regular basis as defined by the organization's bylaws. The board sets the vision through a high-level strategic plan, but it is the role of the executive director to create implementation plans that support the strategic plan.

The executive director is a leadership role for an organization and often fulfills a motivational role in addition to office-based work. Executive directors motivate and mentor members, volunteers, and staff, and may chair meetings. The executive director leads the organization and develops its organizational culture.

== United Kingdom (UK) ==
In the UK, an executive director is a member of a board who is also an employee with a senior role. It is common for boards to have several executive directors, e.g. for different departments.

There is no legal difference between the duties of an executive and a non-executive director (NXD or NED), but there are considerable differences in the expectations associated with the role.
